Mohammad Israil Mansuri is an Indian Politician from Rashtriya Janata Dal and Member of the Bihar Legislative Assembly from Kanti.

References 

Rashtriya Janata Dal politicians
Bihar MLAs 2020–2025
Living people
Year of birth missing (living people)